Smith Dykins Atkins (June 9, 1836 – March 27, 1913) was an American newspaper editor, lawyer, and a Union Army colonel during the American Civil War, who temporarily commanded brigades of infantry and cavalry and who was awarded the brevet grades of brigadier general and major general of Volunteers. After hostilities ended he returned to his editorial work and became an author.

Early life and career
Atkins was born in Horseheads, New York, in 1836. He moved to Illinois in 1845 and later entered the Rock River Seminary in Mount Morris. He also became editor of the town's Gazette and began practicing law. He was a supporter of and canvasser for Abraham Lincoln for President of the United States. He was elected Prosecuting Attorney in 1860. He was the first man to enlist as a volunteer private soldier in Stephenson County, Illinois upon the outbreak of the Civil War.

Civil War service
Upon President Lincoln's call for volunteers at the outbreak of the Civil War, Atkins immediately chose to defend the Union cause and entered the volunteer ranks of his home state. He served in the western theater of the conflict. He was appointed a captain in the 11th Illinois Infantry on April 30, 1861, and was promoted to major on March 21, 1862. By April he was assistant adjutant general of the 4th Division in the Army of the Tennessee, but resigned on April 17 to take a two-month respite from duty for health reasons.

Atkins re-entered military service that fall when he was appointed the colonel of the 92nd Illinois Mounted Infantry on September 4, 1862. By February 1863 he was given brigade command in the Army of Kentucky (Department of the Cumberland) until June 8. Next he commanded a brigade in the Army of the Cumberland's Reserve Corps until July 15, when he was transferred to the Department's Cavalry Corps. He then commanded two brigades of cavalry of the Department of the Cumberland and one in the Military Department of the Mississippi in 1864 and into 1865. During these commands, he led a brigade of cavalry during Major General William T. Sherman's March to the Sea.

Although Atkins was not appointed as a full, substantive grade general, on January 23, 1865, President Abraham Lincoln nominated Atkins to the grade of brevet brigadier general of volunteers, to rank from January 12, 1865, and the U.S. Senate confirmed the award on February 14, 1865. Atkins was mustered out of the volunteer service on June 21, 1865 and he returned to his civilian life in Illinois. On March 21, 1866, President Andrew Johnson nominated Atkins for the award of the grade of brevet major general of volunteers, to rank from March 13, 1865, and the U.S. Senate confirmed the award on April 26, 1866.

Brigade commands
Smith Dykins Atkins commanded several brigades in the Union Army during the American Civil War. The units and dates were:

Infantry
 2nd Brigade, Absalom Baird's Division, Department of the Cumberland (February – June 8, 1863)
 1st Brigade, 1st Division, Reserve Corps, Army of the Cumberland (June 8 – July 15, 1863)

Cavalry
 3rd Brigade, 2nd Division, Cavalry Corps, Department of the Cumberland (January 28 – February 20, 1864)
 3rd Brigade, 3rd Division, Cavalry Corps, Department of the Cumberland (May 13 – May 21, 1864)
 2nd Brigade, 3rd Division, Cavalry Corps, Military Division of the Mississippi (November 5, 1864 – January 12, 1865)

Marriage to Ella Swain
As the Civil War ended, General Atkins was in charge of the forces occupying the college town of Chapel Hill, North Carolina. On April 17, 1865 (Easter Sunday), Atkins paid a visit to the home of David Swain, the president of the University of North Carolina. Both men shared a love of history. While the two were talking, President Swain's daughter Ella brought them a history book. Atkins soon began courting Ella, and the couple were married on August 23, 1865. The marriage was controversial, and Ella's mother would not eat at the same table with Atkins. The couple resided in Freeport. Atkins and Ella had six children, three of whom survived to adulthood. Ella died of influenza at age 38, and was buried in [Historic] Oakwood Cemetery in Raleigh, North Carolina. The story is related in the book Undaunted Heart: The True Story of a Southern Belle & a Yankee General by Suzy Barile, published by Eno Publishers in 2009. Barile is a great-great-granddaughter of Ella Swain and Smith Atkins.

Postbellum
Atkins became editor of Freeport's Daily Journal newspaper and also was the city's postmaster for 24 years. He published a number of short works, and speeches late in life. He was the first president of the Freeport Public Library, and a member of the board of education. He was also active in veterans' organizations and affairs. Atkins died in Freeport in 1913, and is buried there in City Cemetery.

Works
Democracy and Dred Scott (1860; essay)
With Sherman's Cavalry Marching Through Georgia (1870; essay)
"Chickamauga. Useless, Disastrous Battle" (1907; speech)
"Abraham Lincoln" (1909; speech)

See also

List of American Civil War Generals (Union)

Notes

References
 Barile, Suzy, Undaunted Heart: The True Story of a Southern Belle & a Yankee General, Eno Publishers, 2009; ; ebook .
 Broili, Susan, Love even overcomes animosity left from war, Chapel Hill Herald, February 14, 2000.
 Eicher, John H., and Eicher, David J., Civil War High Commands, Stanford University Press, 2001, .

External links
 
 
 
 

1836 births
1913 deaths
People from Freeport, Illinois
People from Horseheads, New York
People of New York (state) in the American Civil War
People of Illinois in the American Civil War
Union Army colonels
School board members in Illinois
Editors of Illinois newspapers
Writers from Illinois
Writers from New York (state)
19th-century American politicians
Journalists from New York (state)
Journalists from Illinois